Richard "Dick" Burdick, (28 May 1929-February 25 2018) served as the International Commissioner of the Boy Scouts of America from 1996 to 2003, after a long career with the BSA. While working at E.I. duPont de Numours in La Porte, Texas, he developed Heat Transfer Cement which became the basis of his company, Thermon Manufacturing, founded by him in Houston in 1954.

In 2004, Burdick was awarded the 299th Bronze Wolf, the only distinction of the World Organization of the Scout Movement, awarded by the World Scout Committee for exceptional services to world Scouting.

References

Recipients of the Bronze Wolf Award
Boy Scouts of America
People from New Braunfels, Texas
1929 births
2018 deaths